Revival is the ninth studio album by American rapper Eminem. The album was released on December 15, 2017, through Aftermath Entertainment, Shady Records and Interscope Records. Production for the album took place during 2016 to 2017 at various recording studios. In addition to Eminem himself, music production was handled by various record producers, including Rick Rubin, Fredwreck, Skylar Grey, Alex da Kid, and executive producer Dr. Dre. Revival features guest appearances from artists Beyoncé, Phresher, Ed Sheeran, Alicia Keys, X Ambassadors, Skylar Grey, Kehlani, and Pink.

Eminem first revealed that he was working on an album following the release of "Campaign Speech" in October 2016. A year later, he performed a viral freestyle at the 2017 BET Hip Hop Awards, criticizing then-President Donald Trump. The album has many lines critiquing Trump's presidential campaign and election.

The album's lead single, "Walk on Water", featuring Beyoncé, was released on November 10, 2017. "Untouchable" was released as a promotional single a week prior to the album's release. Revival was leaked online on December 13, 2017, two days before the album's release date. The album issued several more singles, including "River", featuring Ed Sheeran, "Nowhere Fast", featuring Kehlani, and "Remind Me". A music video for "Framed" was also released on April 3, 2018.

Reception to Revival was mixed, with critics divided over its rock-influenced production on several songs and the heavy use of pop artists for guest appearances. The album debuted at number one in Australia, Canada, Finland, the UK, and the US. In addition, it was the UK Christmas number one album of 2017 and has been certified platinum in the UK. It was followed by Kamikaze (2018), Eminem's tenth studio album, in which he reacts to criticism of Revival.

Background
Eminem first revealed that he was working on an album when he announced the song "Campaign Speech" on his Twitter in October 2016, writing, "Don't worry I'm working on an album! Here's something meanwhile." Rumors about the release date started in late 2016, saying the album would be called Success and would be released sometime in January 2017. A fake tracklist also was leaked at the same time, with Adele, Chance the Rapper, Kid Cudi, Vince Staples, The Weeknd and Mástein Bennett as featured artists. Rumors were sparked again in February and March 2017, when Eminem announced he was headlining three shows in Reading, Glasgow and Leeds. Various news articles said that because he was performing, he would have to release new material to perform, or at least preview, at the festivals.

On October 10, 2017, Eminem performed a freestyle titled "The Storm" at the 2017 BET Hip Hop Awards, criticizing former President Donald Trump. The freestyle went viral, garnering millions of views and hundreds of thousands of likes on YouTube within weeks.

On October 25, 2017, Paul Rosenberg posted a photo to Instagram of Yelawolf's Trial by Fire. In the background of the photo, there is a billboard ad promoting a drug called "Revival". Suspicion was aroused when fans noticed that the 'E' in "Revival" was reversed, similar to Eminem's previous logos. Visiting the website listed on the billboard ad revealed several clues. On the website, a promotional video about Revival makes references to Eminem's song "Lose Yourself". The website also references "Sing for the Moment", "Brain Damage", "Fack", "Role Model", and "Any Man". According to the website, "Revival" treats "Atrox Rithimus", a nonexistent medical condition. One translation of Atrox Rithimus, from Latin, is 'terrible rhyme'. The website is also registered to one of Eminem's labels, Interscope Records. When the phone number for "Revival" is called, it plays the background music of Dr. Dre's "I Need a Doctor", which Eminem features on. These details led fans to believe Eminem's new album will be called Revival. This would follow suit with the names of two of his last three solo albums, Relapse and Recovery.

Release

The lead single, "Walk on Water", was first performed by Eminem at the 2017 MTV Europe Music Awards on November 12, 2017, with co-producer and writer Skylar Grey on vocals. Both performed the song and a medley of "Stan" / "Love the Way You Lie" on Saturday Night Live on November 18.

The album release date was teased multiple times. On November 28, 2017, the release date of the album was announced to be December 15 via both Dr. Dre's and Eminem's social media accounts, while also revealing the fake drug campaign of the record. On December 5, Eminem shared a complete list of all the tracks featuring on his album via his Instagram account. The list features a total of 19 tracks, including an interlude track to Revival, featuring artists such as Phresher, Ed Sheeran, Skylar Grey, Alicia Keys, X Ambassadors, Pink and Kehlani.

On December 7, 2017, the album cover was revealed and projected onto a Detroit building. That night, the song "Untouchable" was released and a pre-order was set up on iTunes. Billboard's Tatiana Cirisano listed the cover as one of the worst of 2017, dubbing it "provocative but undeniably cringeworthy".

Singles
On November 8, 2017, Eminem tweeted a picture of a doctor's prescription note with the words "Walk on Water" and "Take as needed" written on it. Additionally, the doctor's note was labeled with the logo for Revival. This caused speculation that the first single would be titled "Walk on Water". On November 9, Paul Rosenberg shared a video on Instagram linking the drug "Revival" with "Walk on Water" and confirming the song, which was subsequently released the next day. An audio video was uploaded to Eminem's YouTube channel. As of December 16, 2017, the video had nearly 50 million views and over 1.1 million likes. On December 23, 2017, the music video for the song was released exclusively on Apple Music and Eminem's official Vevo channel. "Walk on Water" debuted at number 14 on the Billboard Hot 100, becoming the 57th entry for both artists on the chart.

"River", featuring Ed Sheeran, was released as a second single of the album. The song was released to radio on January 5, 2018, and was released a single on February 7. An audio video was uploaded to Eminem's YouTube channel on December 14, 2017. As of January 15, 2018, the video has over 60 million views and 1 million likes. On February 14, 2018, the music video for the song was released on Eminem's official Vevo channel. Commercially, it has reached number one in the United Kingdom, Norway, and Sweden as well as the top 10 in Australia, Austria, Canada, Denmark, Finland, Germany, Hungary, Ireland, Italy, the Netherlands, New Zealand, Portugal, and Switzerland, and the top 20 in Belgium and the United States.

The album's third single, "Nowhere Fast" featuring Kehlani, impacted US Contemporary hit radio on March 27, 2018. The two artists performed the song at the 2018 iHeartRadio Music Awards. "Remind Me" was released to Italian radio as the fourth single from the album on July 6, 2018.

"Framed", a horrorcore song, received a music video on April 3, 2018, inspired by 1980s horror films.

Promotional singles
"Untouchable" was released as a promotional single on December 8, 2017. The song features a sample from the song "Earache My Eye" by comedy duo Cheech & Chong. A remix of "Chloraseptic" featuring 2 Chainz and Phresher was released as a promotional single on January 8, 2018.

Content
According to Eminem, the album's title is "kind of a double entendre. It's a revival for myself and (that's) the theme of the album. But there's also hopefully the revival of America."

Revival has many lines critiquing Donald Trump's presidential campaign and election. On "Like Home", he raps his regret over having collaborated with Trump on a mock national convention in which Trump endorses his Slim Shady persona. Such criticisms are contrasted by lyrics such as those on "Like Home" celebrating the sanctity of U.S. civil liberties and calling for a "brand new America" without Trump. On "Heat", Eminem jokes that he agrees with the then-president about one thing—grabbing women by the "pussy".

On "Untouchable", Eminem addresses racism in America, including police brutality, blaming it on Republicans and criticizing the philosophy of 'pull yourself up by the bootstraps', retorting, "where the fuck are the boots?" "Nowhere Fast" deals with gun violence in the U.S., with an extended version naming the National Rifle Association as being largely responsible.

Two joke-laden tracks focus on newfound romance and related sexual escapades: "Remind Me", which samples Joan Jett & the Blackhearts' "I Love Rock 'n' Roll", and "Heat", which samples clips from the film Boogie Nights (1997). Framed is a horrorcore track that calls back to the rapper’s older work. 

The last three songs, "In Your Head", "Castle", and "Arose" deal with the rapper's personal life. The first of these, sampling The Cranberries' "Zombie", expresses regret regarding some of his early lyrics related to his Slim Shady persona. "Castle" is structured as a series of letters to his daughter, Hailie Mathers, climaxing in a series of events in 2007 which led to him overdosing, also expressing a struggle with fame which made him consider quitting rap. Continuing the theme, in "Arose", Eminem pens thoughts to his family from the perspective of his near-death experience. Finding his strength to continue living, he rewinds to the near the end of the previous track, where he considers quitting the industry, then continues in a new direction to his sobriety and the success of his more recent work, with high hopes for the current album.

Critical reception

Upon release, Revival generally polarized music critics, as many were divided over its perceived lack of focus, lyrics, heavy sampling of rock music in the production, and the abundance of pop artists for guest appearances. At Metacritic, which assigns a normalized rating out of 100 to reviews from mainstream publications, the album received an average score of 50, based on 24 reviews, indicating "mixed or average" reviews.

Don Needham of The Guardian criticized the album's production and focus, stating that "If Eminem thinks his verbal box of tricks can overcome the weakness of any backing track, his recent albums get demonstrated otherwise." In a positive review, Andy Gill of The Independent complimented the album's lyrical themes: "But ultimately, it's all about Eminem himself, and nowhere more dynamically than in the berserk self-assessment "Offended", where he asserts, amongst other things, that if the time he spent writing were taken into account, he'd be a minimum-wage slavea faintly ludicrous claim, but immediately backed up by a bravura extended burst of rapid-rap babble that both explains and exemplifies his skills, and leaves one wondering not just how long it took to write, but how on earth he manages to pronounce such a polysyllabic torrent so perfectly." Neil McCormick of The Daily Telegraph stated that Revival "represents Eminem on top form, which is to say unstoppable, unbeatable yet often indefensible."

The Irish Times concluded that Revival is "mildly more admirable than previous outings but no more enjoyable. A chance to bust out of the slump has passed Eminem by. It just might never happen for him." In a mixed review, Jon Caramanica of The New York Times remarked that while the album is "probably the best of his recent albums", he criticized Eminem's apparent lack of awareness to the evolution of hip hop's sound in general, arguing that he is too "beholden to his own aesthetic." In a negative review, Consequence of Sound gave the album an "F" rating, calling the album "ugly, arthritic, and pleasureless" and "a disaster".
   
Comparing Revival to Eminem's previous bodies of work, Matthew Ismael Ruiz of Pitchfork stated that "Musically, Revival is no different, chock full of piano ballads and pop-star features that echo the most cynically commercial corners of his catalog. The shock value comes not from the album's overwhelmingly bland hooks or cringe-worthy humor (of which there is plenty), but from the moments where his growth as a human is most apparent", concluding that "Revival is another late-career album that does little for his legacy." Writing for Vice, Robert Christgau found the album "much cleverer than lemmings claim, bluntly and intelligently political too, but so received in its cartoon misogyny and pop grandeur you know he felt irrelevance bearing down even before #MeToo killed this album on the vine". He singled out "Untouchable", "Chloraseptic", and "Like Home" as highlights.

Trent Clark from HipHopDX said that "Eminem's dedication to wrecking mics like Robert Mueller can never be questioned but the production choices still remain an enigma. When he doesn't bath in lamely visible rock samples like Joan Jett and the Blackhearts' "I Love Rock 'n' Roll" or The Cranberries' "Zombie" (on "Remind Me" or "In Your Head" respectively), he's mostly square pegging his intensified lyrics on mechanical slabs of assembly line pop hybrids." He singled out "Framed" and "Castle" as highlights:it's largely the retreads of past glory where he hits his stride the hardest. On the hypnotically-produced "Framed," Marshall dons the hockey mask for old times sake and pulls up off homicidal fantasies that for better or worse, feature the album's most in-pocket rhyme moment. And when he plunges into his drug-altered psyche to speak on his greatest love — his daughter Haile Jade — the ever-reliable DJ Khalil steps up to the plate on "Castle" with a darkened soundbed of macabre guitars and deathly drum marches that feature the album's most vintage Eminem moment.Mitch Findlay from HotNewHipHop wrote: "Revival is, by far, Eminem's most pop-friendly album to date. While previous albums merely flirted with the sound, Revival has bought a ring and proposed to it. Therefore, if you're somebody who finds no pleasure in the production of 'pop-rap,' you'll find no solace here." He singled out "Framed," "Castle" and "Arose" as highlights, with the latter two being "among Revivals strongest tracks. Conceptually and lyrically, the closing pair find Eminem in excellent form, and longtime fans will no doubt cite these two as album highlights."

Commercial performance

Revival is Eminem's eighth consecutive album to top the US Billboard 200, debuting with 267,000 album-equivalent units, 197,000 being traditional album sales. As a result, Eminem became the first musical act to get eight entries in a row debut at its summit.

Revival entered atop the UK Albums Chart with 132,000 album-equivalent units, becoming the year's second largest opening behind Ed Sheeran's ÷ and giving the rapper his eighth consecutive number-one album. As of October 2018, it sold 321,000 album-equivalent units in the UK.

It additionally arrived at number one in Australia, becoming his ninth entry to top the ARIA Albums Chart. The album then fell behind ÷ the following week.

In 2018, Revival was ranked as the 32nd most popular album of the year on the Billboard 200.

Track listing
Credits adapted from Tidal.

Track notes
  signifies a co-producer.
  signifies an additional producer.
 "Remind Me" features backing vocals by Mr. Porter.
 "Revival (Interlude)" features vocals by Alice and the Glass Lake.
 "Offended" features vocals by Kent Jones.
 "Castle" features vocals by Liz Rodrigues.

Sample credits
 "Chloraseptic" contains elements of "It's My Thing", written by Erick Sermon and Parrish Smith and performed by EPMD.
 "Untouchable" contains samples of "Earache My Eye", written by Tommy Chong, Gaye Delorme, Richard Marin and performed by Cheech & Chong, and "Born to Roll", written by Duval Clear, Andre Brown, Tyrone Kelsie and Eric McIntosh and performed by Masta Ace Incorporated.
 "Remind Me" contains samples of "I Love Rock 'n' Roll", written by Alan Merrill, Jake Hooker and performed by Joan Jett and the Blackhearts; "Saturday Night", written and performed by Schoolly D and "Bust a Move", written by Matt Dike, Luther Rabb, James Walters and Marvin Young and performed by Young MC.
 "Revival (Interlude)" contains elements of "Human of the Year", written and performed by Regina Spektor.
 "Framed" contains samples of "Pilgrim", written by David John Byron and Kenneth William Hensley and performed by C&K Vocal.
 "Heat" contains samples of "King of Rock", written by Darryl McDaniels, Joseph Simmons and Larry Smith and performed by Run-DMC, "Girls", written by Adam Horovitz and Rick Rubin and performed by the Beastie Boys and an uncredited sample of "Intro (Feel the Heat)" from the film Boogie Nights and performed by John C. Reilly and Mark Wahlberg.
 "Offended" contains samples of "In You (I Found a Love)", written by Charles Bradley, Thomas Brenneck, David Guy and Leon Michels and performed by Charles Bradley.
 "In Your Head" contains samples of "Zombie", written by Dolores O'Riordan and performed by The Cranberries.
 "Arose" contains samples of "I'm Gonna Love You Just a Little More Baby", written and performed by Barry White and "The Rose", written by Amanda McBroom and performed by Bette Midler.

Personnel
Credits adapted from the album's liner notes.

Performers
 Eminem – vocals
 Beyoncé – vocals 
 Phresher – vocals 
 Ed Sheeran – vocals 
 Alicia Keys – vocals 
 X Ambassadors – vocals 
 Skylar Grey – vocals 
 Kehlani – vocals 
 Pink – vocals 

Technical
 Mike Strange – recording engineer , mixing engineer 
 Joe Strange – recording engineer 
 Jason Lader – recording engineer 
 Stuart White – recording engineer 
 Rob Bisel – assistant recording engineer 
 Johnnie Burik – assistant recording engineer 
 Tony Campana – assistant recording engineer 
 Manny Marroquin – mixing engineer 
 Eminem – mixing engineer 
 Mauricio "Veto" Iragorri – recording engineer 
 Robert Reyes – assistant recording engineer 
 Charles "CharlieRed" Garcia – assistant recording engineer 
 Dr. Dre – mixing engineer 
 Quentin "Q" Gilkey – mixing engineer 
 Frequency – recording engineer 
 Aalias – recording engineer 
 Just Blaze – recording engineer 
 Andrew Wright – recording engineer 
 Ann Mincieli – recording engineer 
 Brendan Morawski – assistant recording engineer 
 Travis Ference – recording engineer 
 Sam Harris – recording engineer 
 Chris Galland – mixing engineer 
 Robin Florent – assistant mixing engineer 
 Scott Desmarais – assistant mixing engineer 
 Steve Hammons – recording engineer 
 Adam Comstock – recording engineer 
 Darwin Sanchez – recording engineer 
 Scram Jones – recording engineer 
 Myles William – percussion, programming 

Production
 Rick Rubin – producer 
 Skylar Grey – producer 
 Eminem – producer , co-producer 
 Luis Resto – additional producer 
 Mr. Porter – additional producer , producer 
 Mark Batson – producer 
 Emile Haynie – producer 
 Dr. Dre – producer 
 Neff-U – producer 
 Trevor Lawrence – producer 
 Frequency – producer 
 Aalias – producer 
 Just Blaze – producer 
 Alex da Kid – producer 
 Fredwreck – producer 
 Rock Mafia – producer 
 Hit-Boy – producer 
 Illa da Producer – producer 
 Scram Jones – producer 
 DJ Khalil – producer

Charts

Weekly charts

Year-end charts

Certifications and sales

Legacy 
Eminem said of the reaction to Revival: "I think there's things to be taken away from this album and the reaction to it. Were there too many songs? Were there too many features? There were certain songs like 'Tragic Endings' and 'Need Me' where I felt like lyrically they would give the listener a second to breathe. I spend a lot of time writing shit that I think nobody ever gets." Later he said: "When the Revival tracklist came down the pipe, it was like overwhelmingly, 'This shit is going to be trash.' Nobody really wanted to be wrong about it. I'm not saying everybody, but a lot of people had already formed their opinion." He also stated that he is proud of the album, saying: "I'm good with Revival. Fuck it. Because I couldn't have made this album [Kamikaze] without it."

On the Kamikaze opener, "The Ringer", Eminem criticizes detractors of Revival but apologizes for alienating fans who supported Trump while maintaining that he believes Trump is an "evil serpent"  and says that he was questioned by the U.S. Secret Service for his seemingly threatening lyrics against the president. This led BuzzFeed to file a Freedom of Information Act request with the Secret Service to find out if the claim was true. In October 2019, the agency revealed to BuzzFeed that, in response to an email from a TMZ employee pressing the agency to investigate Eminem for his "threatening lyrics" about Donald and Ivanka Trump, they had conducted a background check and arranged an interview, in which the interviewers read the verse out loud to Eminem—and he rapped along. The agency subsequently decided against referring the case to a federal prosecutor.

Revival is widely considered Eminem's worst and most polarizing album by fans and critics. The CD case for Revival appears in the music videos for two songs from Kamikaze: "Fall" and "Venom".

References 
Footnotes

Citations

2017 albums
Aftermath Entertainment albums
Albums produced by Alex da Kid
Albums produced by DJ Khalil
Albums produced by Dr. Dre
Albums produced by Emile Haynie
Albums produced by Eminem
Albums produced by Fredwreck
Albums produced by Hit-Boy
Albums produced by Just Blaze
Albums produced by Mark Batson
Albums produced by Mr. Porter
Albums produced by Rick Rubin
Albums produced by Rock Mafia
Albums produced by Scram Jones
Albums produced by Skylar Grey
Eminem albums
Interscope Records albums
Shady Records albums
Albums recorded at Shangri-La (recording studio)
Rap rock albums by American artists
Political hip hop albums